Old Forge is an unincorporated community in Quincy Township, Franklin County, Pennsylvania, United States, within the Michaux State Forest, at  (39.7945378, -77.4841559), at altitude of 892 feet (272 m).

References

http://www.roadsidethoughts.com/pa/old-forge.htm
http://www.maplandia.com/united-states/pennsylvania/franklin-county/old-forge/ map
http://www.usgwarchives.org/maps/pa/county/frankl/usgs/
http://pennsylvania.hometownlocator.com/pa/franklin/

Unincorporated communities in Franklin County, Pennsylvania
Unincorporated communities in Pennsylvania